Fabio Agustín Verdugo (born 18 September 1997) is an Argentine professional footballer who plays as a midfielder for Independiente Rivadavia.

Career
Verdugo started in the youth of Deportivo Argentino, before joining Godoy Cruz. His senior career with the club got underway in 2017. He made his professional debut in a 0–0 draw with Defensa y Justicia on 7 May, prior to making eight further appearances in all competitions throughout the 2016–17 Argentine Primera División campaign. He netted his first pro goal on 14 April 2018 during a victory at home to Temperley.

Career statistics
.

References

External links

1997 births
Living people
Sportspeople from Mendoza, Argentina
Argentine footballers
Association football midfielders
Argentine Primera División players
Primera Nacional players
Godoy Cruz Antonio Tomba footballers
Club Atlético Mitre footballers
Nueva Chicago footballers
Independiente Rivadavia footballers